Passaloecus cuspidatus is a species of aphid wasp in the family Crabronidae. It is found in North America.

References

Further reading

External links

 

Crabronidae
Articles created by Qbugbot
Insects described in 1856